Arthurlie Football Club are a Scottish football club from Barrhead, East Renfrewshire. Based at Dunterlie Park, they play in the West of Scotland Football League. The club played in the Scottish Football League in two spells, 1901 to 1915 and 1923 to 1929. They have won the Scottish Junior Cup twice, in 1937 and 1998.

History
Arthurlie was founded in 1874 and played as a senior side until 1929. The club reached the quarter-finals of the Scottish Cup in three consecutive seasons from 1880–81, with their 1883 tie with Kilmarnock Athletic taking four games to settle. A notable early result was a 4–2 defeat of Celtic in the first round of the 1896–97 Scottish Cup. Celtic avenged this defeat with a 7–0 victory in Barrhead at the same stage the following season and the two clubs met again in Arthurlie's last Scottish Cup tie to date in 1929, with the Glasgow side winning 5–1 at Celtic Park.

With regard to league football, the club became a founder member of the Scottish Football Federation in 1891, winning that competition in its first year before joining the Scottish Football Alliance in 1893. Arthurlie obtained membership of the Scottish Football League in 1901 and achieved modest results in the Second Division, with a highest finish of joint second in 1906–07. That division ceased operations in 1915, during the First World War, but Arthurlie did not immediately rejoin the league after the war ended. They instead waited until 1923 to apply for membership of the newly created Third Division. Arthurlie immediately won the Third Division championship, and four reasonably successful seasons in the Second Division followed. Financial problems forced the club to resign its membership of the league with six games of the 1928–29 season to play. As the club had played all the promotion-chasing clubs, their results were allowed to stand.

A club of the same name joined the Junior grade during the early 1930s. They found success quickly with a Scottish Junior Cup win in 1937 – defeating Kirkintilloch Rob Roy 5–1 in the final in front of a crowd of 23,000 at Celtic Park. Two unsuccessful final appearances followed, against Fauldhouse United in 1946, then derby rivals Pollok in 1981, before they lifted the trophy again in 1998, taking revenge on Pollok with a 4–0 victory in the final at Fir Park with strikes from Mark McLaughlin, Johnny Millar, Steven Convery and Steven Nugent.

In the Junior Super League era, the club were the first ever winners of the second tier West of Scotland Super League First Division in 2003 and enjoyed an unbroken 15 seasons in the West of Scotland Super League Premier Division until relegation to the newly configured SJFA West Region Championship in 2018.

The club's most recent trophy success was in the 2015 West of Scotland Cup final, defeating Kilwinning Rangers 4–2 at Newlandsfield Park, with goals from Gary Smith (3), and Ryan McGregor. It was Arthurlie's sixth victory in the West of Scotland Cup, a feat equalled by Pollok in 2017 and only Auchinleck Talbot (12) and Irvine Meadow (9), have won the tournament more often.

The team are managed by former Scotland Junior international defender, Duncan Sinclair, who joined the club from Larkhall Thistle in June 2018. Sinclair has also previously managed Shotts Bon Accord, Kilsyth Rangers and Lanark United. He is Arthurlie's ninth manager since 2010.

On 15 April 2020, Andy McFadyen become the club's new manager. On 18 July 2022, Craig Palmer was appointed as new manager.

Scottish Junior Cup finals record

Ground
In 1882 Arthurlie moved to the first Dunterlie Park from their Arthurlie Cross ground. They moved to the second Dunterlie Park in 1906, and the current Dunterlie Park in 1919.

Honours

League 
Scottish Football League
 Division Three champions 1923–24Scottish FederationChampions 1891–92Scottish CombinationChampions 1900–01SJFA West RegionDivision One champions 2002–03Central Junior LeaguePremier Division champions 1987–88, 1988–89, 1993–94, 2000–01
Western Division champions 1936–37
Division B champions 1942–43

 Cup Scottish Junior CupWinners 1937, 1998Scottish Consolation CupWinners 1910Western LeagueLeague Cup winners 1924Renfrewshire FA Challenge CupWinners 1881, 1882Renfrewshire Junior FA Challenge CupWinners – 1934, 1945, 1950, 1951, 1955, 1956, 1957West of Scotland Challenge CupWinners 1943, 1976, 1978, 1997, 2011, 2015Renfrewshire & Dumbartonshire CupWinners 1934, 1951, 1955, 1957, 1960Evening Times TrophyWinners 1937, 1946Evening Times Cup Winners TrophyWinners 1987, 1989, 1994, 1995, 2001, 2011Central Junior LeagueLeague Cup winners 1939, 1987, 1991, 1997, 1998, 2003, 2008
Sectional League Cup winners 1979, 1987, 2009, 2010JC Alan Challenge Cup:'Winners 2012
Champions League winners 1972,1985

References

Further reading
Dave Twydell (1993) Rejected FC Glasgow & District, Yore Publishing
John Aitken (2013) The Scottish Football League 125, Scottish Non League publishing
John Aitken (2005) West of Scotland Juniors. Scottish Non League publishing
John Aitken (2013) The Scottish Junior Football Association 125 years, Scottish Non League publishing
Brian McColl (2013) Western League'', Scottish Football Archive

External links
Official website
Facebook
Twitter

 
Association football clubs established in 1874
Football clubs in Scotland
Scottish Junior Football Association clubs
Football in East Renfrewshire
Scottish Football League teams
1874 establishments in Scotland
Barrhead
West of Scotland Football League teams